Iosif Ritter (2 December 1921 – 30 August 2006) was a Romanian football midfielder and referee. As a player he reached the 1948 Cupa României final with CFR Timișoara, which was lost with 3–2 against ITA Arad. As a referee, he arbitrated the 1967 Cupa României final. He also arbitrated at international and European club level.

International career
Iosif Ritter played 17 matches for Romania's national team, including 12 at the 1946, 1947 and 1948 Balkan Cups. He was part of Romania's squad at the 1952 Summer Olympics.

Honours
Locomotiva Timișoara
Cupa României runner-up: 1947–48

Notes

References

External links

1921 births
2006 deaths
Romanian footballers
Romania international footballers
Association football midfielders
Olympic footballers of Romania
Footballers at the 1952 Summer Olympics
Liga I players
FC Rapid București players
FC CFR Timișoara players
Romanian football referees
Sportspeople from Timișoara